Semitic neopaganism is a group of religions based on or attempting to reconstruct the ancient Semitic religions, mostly practiced among ethnic Jews in the United States.

Jewish neopaganism

The notion of historical Israelite or Jewish polytheism was popularized in the United States during the 1960s by Raphael Patai in The Hebrew Goddess, focusing on the cult of female goddesses such as the cult of Asherah in Solomon's Temple.

During the growth of Neopaganism in the United States throughout the 1970s, a number of minor Canaanite or Israelite oriented groups emerged. Most contained syncretistic elements from Western esotericism.

Forms of witchcraft religions inspired by the Semitic milieu, such as Jewitchery, may also be enclosed within the Semitic neopagan movement. These groups are particularly influenced by Jewish feminism, focusing on the goddess cults of the Israelites.

A notable contemporary Levantine Neopagan group is known as Am Ha Aretz (lit. "People of the Land", a rabbinical term for uneducated and religiously unobservant Jews), "AmHA" for short, based in Israel. This group grew out of Ohavei Falcha, "Lovers of the Soil", a movement founded in the late 19th century.

Elie Sheva, according to her own testimony an "elected leader of AmHA" reportedly founded an American branch of the group, known as the Primitive Hebrew Assembly.

Beit Asherah ("House of Asherah") was one of the first Jewish neopagan groups, founded in the early 1990s by Stephanie Fox, Steven Posch, and Magenta Griffiths. Magenta Griffiths is High Priestess of the Beit Asherah coven, and a former board member of the Covenant of the Goddess.

Semitic neopagan movements have also been reported in Israel and in Lebanon.

Kohenet movement and "Jewitches"
In 2006, rabbi Jill Hammer founded the Kohenet Hebrew Priestess Institute, which has a stated mission to "reclaim and innovate embodied, earth-based feminist Judaism", inspired by pre-Israelite Semitic religion priestess such as Enheduanna, who was a devotee of the goddess Inanna. The word kohenet is the feminine declension of kohen, the priestly lineage in Jewish tradition. The ordination of "Hebrew priestesses" has led to some consternation in the Jewish community, with some feeling that the Kohenet movement is not solely Jewish, due to the presence of aspects of paganism some Jews see as incompatible with Judaism. The syncretic aspects of this religious movement have been characterized as "goddess worship", and the movement has been seen as expressing a creative approach to problems posed by non-egalitarian streams of Judaism. Similar organizations include the Lilith Institute (also known as Mishkan Shekhinah), an organization and community more overtly aligned with Wicca and other feminist/goddess-centered neo-pagan movements than the Kohenet Institute. A related movement is "Jewitches" (sometimes styled as JeWitches), Jews – often but not exclusively women – who combine Jewish religious tradition and witchcraft, often including elements of Semitic neo-paganism.

See also
 Canaanism
 Christianity and neopaganism
 Folk Judaism
 Jewish Buddhist
 Practical Kabbalah
 Witchcraft and divination in the Hebrew Bible

References

Further reading
Engelberg, Keren (October 30, 2003). "When Witches Blend Torah and Tarot" reprinted in The Jewish Journal (July 21, 2008)
Hunter, Jennifer (July 1, 2006). Magickal Judaism: Connecting Pagan & Jewish Practice. Citadel. , .
Jacobs, Jill Suzanne. "Nice Jewitch Girls Leave Their Brooms in the Closet" in The Forward, Oct 31, 2003
Michaelson, Jay (December 9, 2005). "Jewish Paganism: Oxymoron or Innovation?" in The Jewish Daily Forward.
Raphael, Melissa (April 1998). "Goddess Religion, Postmodern Jewish Feminism, and the Complexity of Alternative Religious Identities". ‌Nova Religio, Vol. 1, No. 2, Pages 198–215 (abstract can be found at: Caliber: University of California Press )
Various authors. "Jewish Paganism" in Green Egg, Winter 1994 (Volume 27, #107).
Winkler, Rabbi Gershon (January 10, 2003). Magic of the Ordinary: Recovering the Shamanic in Judaism. North Atlantic Books. , .

External links
Primitive Hebrew Assembly (Am Ha Aretz USA)
Tel Shemesh

Jewish American culture
Jewish Israeli culture
Judaism and paganism
Modern pagan traditions
Modern paganism in the United States
Religion in the Middle East